UBS Arena is a multi-purpose indoor arena located at Belmont Park in Elmont, New York, directly adjacent to the New York City limits. Opened in 2021, it is the home of the New York Islanders of the National Hockey League (NHL), replacing the Nassau Coliseum. The arena officially seats 17,250 patrons for NHL games and up to 19,000 for concerts and other select events. Fans and sports writers have affectionately nicknamed the arena "The Stable" due to the arena being located at Belmont Park, a famous thoroughbred racing venue.

History

The Lighthouse Project and Barclays Center
The Nassau Coliseum was the second-oldest facility in the NHL, behind only the twice-renovated Madison Square Garden. It was also the second-smallest arena in the league, with only MTS Centre in Winnipeg being smaller. Various attempts had been made to pursue a renovation or replacement of the aging facility, including the Lighthouse Project—a 2004 proposal to renovate the Coliseum and build a larger sport, entertainment, and residential district around it (including a minor-league ballpark and a 60-story high-rise from which the proposal derived its name). While Nassau County approved a version of the Lighthouse Project, the town of Hempstead never granted a change in zoning that was required for its construction, and the project was reported to have been cancelled.

In May 2010, Jeff Wilpon, then COO of Major League Baseball's New York Mets, had discussions with then-Islanders owner Charles Wang about constructing a new arena for the Islanders in the Willets Point neighborhood of Queens, adjacent to the Mets' ballpark, Citi Field. Wilpon also discussed the possibility of buying the Islanders.

On July 12, 2010, Hempstead supervisor Kate Murray announced an "alternate zone" created for the Coliseum property, downsizing the original Lighthouse Project to half its proposed size and making the project, according to then-Nassau County Executive Ed Mangano and the developers, "economically unviable for both the developer and owner of the site". From that point, the Lighthouse Project would no longer be pursued by Wang, Mangano and the developers.

In June 2010, FanHouse reported that Jeff Wilpon and his father, then-Mets owner Fred Wilpon, had begun working with real estate firm Jones Lang LaSalle (who also worked on the renovation of Madison Square Garden) on a feasibility study of a new Islanders arena in Queens. However, a source from Newsday indicated that the FanHouse report was not true. There were also reports that businessman Nelson Peltz wanted to buy the Islanders and move them to Barclays Center in Brooklyn.

In August 2011, Nassau County voters voted against a referendum that would have granted a $400 million public bond to construct a $350 million arena and $50 million minor league ballpark. The plan was presented by Wang as a last-ditch effort to keep the Islanders in Nassau County. In October 2012, the Islanders announced that they would re-locate to Barclays Center in Brooklyn once their lease of the Coliseum expires after the 2014–15 season. Meanwhile, a group led by Bruce Ratner (who had developed Barclays Center) secured an $89 million bid to renovate the Coliseum, aiming to host a minor hockey team as its main tenant, and have six Islanders games played there per-season.

As Barclays Center was designed primarily as a basketball arena, its hockey configuration was criticized by fans for having seats with obstructed views, while its ice quality was criticized as substandard by players.

Arena deal, construction

In December 2017, New York Arena Partners—a joint venture between the Islanders, Oak View Group, and Sterling Equities, won a bid to construct a new, 18,000-seat arena and mixed-use district at Belmont Park, beating a competing proposal by New York City FC for a new soccer stadium. The new arena was projected to be completed in time for the 2021–22 NHL season. In the meantime, the Islanders began to gradually play more home games at the Coliseum in the 2018–19 season.

On September 23, 2019, the groundbreaking for the arena was held. It was attended by New York state governor Andrew Cuomo, NHL commissioner Gary Bettman, and officials, alumni, and current players from the Islanders. In February 2020, it was announced that beginning with the 2020 playoffs, the Islanders would temporarily return to the Coliseum for all home games before moving to the Belmont Park arena for the 2021–22 season. 

Due to the COVID-19 pandemic in New York, all non-essential construction projects in the state of New York were ordered to suspend operations beginning March 27, 2020. Construction was allowed to resume on May 27, 2020; team officials expected construction to finish in time for the Islanders to begin to play in October 2021, despite the two-month pause.

In July 2020, UBS was announced as the naming rights sponsor of the new arena under a 20-year deal, naming the facility UBS Arena.

Opening
The Islanders were to begin playing home games at UBS Arena for the 2021–22 season. To allow additional time for construction to complete, the Islanders' preseason home games were played at Webster Bank Arena in Bridgeport, Connecticut, home of their American Hockey League (AHL) affiliate, the Bridgeport Islanders. The team then played 13 consecutive road games to start the regular season. UBS Arena formally opened on November 19, 2021, with a private fundraising event featuring rock band Chicago. On November 20, the Islanders played their first game at UBS Arena, a 5-2 loss to the Calgary Flames. The Flames' Brad Richardson scored the arena's first goal while Brock Nelson scored the first Islanders goal. 

The Islanders started 0–5–2 at UBS Arena. Their first home win at the venue came on December 11, 2021, in a 4–2 win against the New Jersey Devils.

Social and economic footprint of construction

As the $1.5 billion project and surrounding redevelopment moved forward, it was announced that they would generate approximately $25 billion in economic activity, including major infrastructure improvements, 10,000 construction jobs, and 3,000 permanent jobs. This was seen as a boost to the regional economy at a time when activity had slowed due to the COVID-19 pandemic. The project partners set a goal of having 30 percent of contracting dollars for construction earmarked for state-certified minority and female-owned businesses, and a further 6 percent for service-disabled veteran-owned businesses. The project led to an additional $100 million investment in transit and infrastructure enhancements, including Elmont station, the first newly constructed Long Island Rail Road station in almost 50 years.

Notable events

College basketball
The first college basketball game at UBS Arena was played on December 3, 2021, between the nearby St. John's Red Storm and the Kansas Jayhawks as part of the annual Big East–Big 12 Battle. The Jayhawks won the game 95–75. The Iona Gaels also hosted the Delaware Fightin' Blue Hens on December 21, 2021.

Professional wrestling
The November 29, 2021 episode of WWE's Monday Night Raw took place at the arena. The December 8, 2021 episode of All Elite Wrestling's Dynamite took place at UBS Arena, as well as the taping for that week's episode of AEW Rampage, which aired on December 10.

Mixed martial arts
On July 16, 2022, the arena held its first MMA and UFC event, hosting UFC on ABC: Ortega vs. Rodríguez.

Concerts
British singer Harry Styles held the arena's first public concert on November 28, 2021.

References

External links

2021 establishments in New York (state)
Sports venues completed in 2021
Indoor ice hockey venues in New York (state)
National Hockey League venues
Sports venues in Hempstead, New York
UBS
New York Islanders venues